Jacques-Marie or Jacques Marie may refer to:

Jacques-Marie, vicomte Cavaignac (1773–1855), French general
Jacques Marie (footballer) (1945–1999), French footballer
Jacques-Marie d'Amboise (1538–1611), French hellenist
Jacques-Marie Beauvarlet-Charpentier (1766–1834), French organist and composer
Jacques-Marie Deschamps (1750–1826), French playwright, librettist and writer
Jacques-Marie Huvé (1783–1852), French architect
Jacques-Marie Le Père (1763–1841), French civil engineer
Jacques-Marie Rouzet (1743–1820), French politician

See also

Compound given names
French masculine given names